AAMA or Aama may refer to:

Organizations
American Amusement Machine Association
American Apparel Manufacturers Association
American Automobile Manufacturers Association
Arab American Medical Association, former title of the National Arab American Medical Association
Asia America Multitechnology Association

Other uses
Aama (1964 film)
Aama (2020 film)
Aama, Nepal